The diocesan governor of Tromsø  in Norway was a government agency of the Kingdom of Norway.

The  (diocesan county) of Tromsø was established in 1884 by the King when the Diocese of Trondhjem was divided. The new Tromsø stiftamt encompassed the whole Diocese of Tromsø and it was made up of three subordinate counties: Nordlandenes amt, Finmarkens amt, and Tromsø amt. In 1919, there was a large county reorganization in Norway and every stiftamt was abolished and the counties were renamed .

List of diocesan governors 
The following is a list of the governors of the Tromsø stiftamt.

References

Tromsø stift